Vladimir Pavlovich Muravyov (born 30 September 1959 in Karaganda, Kazakh SSR) is a former Soviet track and field athlete who competed in the sprints. He was the winner of two gold medals in 4×100 m relay at the Olympic Games. He was also three times Soviet champion outdoors, and two times indoor champion.

At the 1980 Summer Olympics, Vladimir Muravyov was sixth in the 100 metres final, but went out in the heats of the 200 metres, but he  ran the opening leg in the Soviet 4×100 m relay team, which won the gold medal. At the 1982 European Championships, Muravyov was seventh in 200 m. At the first World Championships he reached the semifinal in 200 m and was a member of Soviet 4×100 m relay team, which won the bronze.

Muravyov missed the 1984 Summer Olympics due to the boycott. In 1985 he was second behind Poland's Marian Woronin in the European Cup, but went on to win the relay, but was sixth at the 1985 IAAF World Cup in 200 m and third in 4×100 m relay. He won the gold medal at the 1986 European Championships as a member of Soviet 4×100 m relay team.

At the 1987 World Championships, Muravyov was eliminated in the quarterfinal of 100 m, but was second with the Soviet 4×100 m relay team. At the 1988 Summer Olympics, Muravyov was again in the Soviet 4×100 m relay team, which, in the absence of United States, which was disqualified in the heats, won the gold medal.

International competitions

References 

1959 births
Living people
Sportspeople from Karaganda
Kazakhstani male sprinters
Soviet male sprinters
Olympic athletes of the Soviet Union
Olympic gold medalists for the Soviet Union
Athletes (track and field) at the 1980 Summer Olympics
Athletes (track and field) at the 1988 Summer Olympics
World Athletics Championships athletes for the Soviet Union
World Athletics Championships medalists
European Athletics Championships medalists
Medalists at the 1988 Summer Olympics
Medalists at the 1980 Summer Olympics
Olympic gold medalists in athletics (track and field)
Universiade medalists in athletics (track and field)
Honoured Masters of Sport of the USSR
Universiade silver medalists for the Soviet Union
Medalists at the 1981 Summer Universiade
Medalists at the 1983 Summer Universiade
Competitors at the 1986 Goodwill Games
Goodwill Games medalists in athletics
Friendship Games medalists in athletics